Amir Radi (born January 7, 1983) is an Iranian football midfielder .

References

1983 births
Living people
Iranian footballers
Association football midfielders
Sepahan S.C. footballers